was a Japanese art director.

He was born in Tokyo. He developed a skill in drawing, and became among the most prominent set designers in Japanese cinema following World War II.

He won the Mainichi Film Award for Best Art Direction for the 1953 film Ugetsu. In 1955, he served as art director for She Was Like a Wild Chrysanthemum.

Selected filmography
 Typhoon Over Nagasaki (1957)

References

1899 births
1967 deaths
Japanese art directors
People from Tokyo